BNC210 (also known as IW-2143 during its time licensed to Ironwood Pharmaceuticals) is an anxiolytic drug that acts via negative allosteric modulation of the α7-nicotinic acetylcholine receptor, by Bionomics Limited. It is currently being investigated for the treatment of post traumatic stress disorder. The drug has demonstrated clinically significant anxiety reduction in both animal models and in Phase I trials.

It appears to be devoid of significant sedation or memory-impairing side effects, as well as lacking addictive potential in rat discriminatory models.

Phase I trials have shown no serious side effects.

Bionomics previously licensed it to Ironwood Pharmaceuticals in January 2012, where it was known as IW-2143. In December 2012, IW-2143 begun undergoing phase I clinical trials in the United States, but in November 2014, was released back to Bionomics in a mutual agreement. Bionomics will now continue development and clinical testing, with Ironwood receiving a royalty for their work done.

In April 2015, BNC210 was in phase II clinical trials.  The estimated study completion date was September 2018. In October 2018, the company announced that the candidate failed to meet its primary endpoint in treating PTSD but may have shown some anti-depressant and anxiolytic effects (the phase II trial's secondary endpoints). The drug is still being developed and secured Fast Track designation from the FDA based on the drug's novel mechanism of action and the 'large unmet need with PTSD' in the community.  There is a large unmet need for efficacious anxiolytics which do not have the habituation, dependency, sedation, tolerance, and intoxication issues with current generation anxiolytics.

Mechanism of action

There is little information on BNC-210, but it may be a GABA antagonist based on an abstract released, though it is unclear if the abstract is referring to this compound or related compound.  This is somewhat counter-intuitive, as generally, GABA antagonists would produce anxiogenic effects. The only mention here is that there was a discussion 'anxiolytics and GABA agonists' which included BNC-210, but does not specify that BNC-210 is of the latter.  Most relevant here is the date, 2009 appears to be the first time the drug appeared in the readily searchable literature.

It is a negative-allosteric modulator of the alpha-7 nicotinic receptor.   It binds at a site distant from the traditional nicotine binding site for which this receptor is named, (binding acetylcholine in-vivo), and decreases the activity of the ligand gated ion channel.  This has downstream effects, similar to, inhibition at this site. Acetylcholine, while being used very widely and commonly in mammals, is especially prominent in the function of memory and Long-Term Potentiation.  The authors cite the drug's activity in the amygdala, which is the seat of fight-or-flight and emotional responses and thought to be the source for unpleasant symptoms felt by those who have been exposed to particularly strong negative emotional states (Traumatic Stress leading to PTSD.  It should be stated, that the authors present no evidence of the drugs (specific) activity in this location, and it should be considered one proposed mechanism of action.  The study's authors did do fMRI imaging that may show diminished responses in this brain area, but the small sample size and other limitations to fMRI imaging apply here and outside the scope of this article.  The basis for this is the observation of the proposed mechanism of PTSD and the locality of this receptor, in addition to cellular studies on transfected rat and human cells, leads to this proposed mechanism of action. The α7 subtype of the Nicotinic Acetylcholine is heavily represented in the amygdala (along with the mammary bodies (brain structure), and Ammon's horn.  With respect to fMRI data, the drug had a more pronounced effect at the low dose, reportedly on par with Lorazepam, while the high-dose was most similar to Placebo.  This should not be at all interpreted that the effects are even remotely related to those of Lorazepam, only that the effect on suppression of this small, particular part of the brain is similar, in simply a measure of metabolic activity.  The study included only 24 participants, in 4 arms, so drawing major conclusions from the paper is not wise, but it at least provides additional evidence of possible efficacy.

See also 
 List of investigational anxiolytics
 5-Hydroxyindoleacetic acid
 Kynurenic acid

References 

Dipeptides
Anxiolytics
Nicotinic antagonists
Experimental drugs